Rui Pedro Oliveira da Silva (born 5 June 1996) is a Portuguese professional footballer who plays for S.C.U. Torreense as a right-back.

Club career
Born in Lourosa (Santa Maria da Feira), Silva began his youth career at Lusitânia F.C. in his village before eight full years in the ranks of FC Porto. In 2015 he moved to C.D. Santa Clara, where on 2 August he made his professional debut against Atlético Clube de Portugal in the second round of the Taça da Liga; he played the entirety of the 1–1 home draw, before a 6–5 penalty shootout defeat.

On 23 January 2016, Silva was sent off in the first half-hour of a goalless LigaPro draw against U.D. Oliveirense also at the Estádio de São Miguel. He scored his only goal for the club on 20 March in a 2–2 home draw with Clube Oriental de Lisboa.

In June 2017, Silva transferred to S.C. Braga on a three-year contract with the option of three more, being assigned to the reserve team. A year later, he was loaned for a year back to Santa Clara, now in the Primeira Liga. He played only two top-flight games, the first as a substitute in a 2–1 home loss to Sporting CP on 4 November 2018.

Silva returned to the Porto metropolitan area on 7 June 2019, when he signed for Leixões S.C. on a two-year deal. Six months later, he moved across the second division to Académico de Viseu F.C. for the rest of the season.

On 3 June 2020, Silva joined Varzim S.C. still in the second tier. Seven months later, he dropped down a level to return to Lusitânia, before making his way in July 2021 to S.C.U. Torreense in the new Liga 3.

References

External links

Portuguese League profile 

1996 births
Living people
Sportspeople from Santa Maria da Feira
Portuguese footballers
Association football defenders
Primeira Liga players
Liga Portugal 2 players
Campeonato de Portugal (league) players
Lusitânia F.C. players
FC Porto players
Padroense F.C. players
C.D. Santa Clara players
S.C. Braga B players
Leixões S.C. players
Académico de Viseu F.C. players
Varzim S.C. players
S.C.U. Torreense players
Portugal youth international footballers